Det drønner gjennom dalen (English: A Boom through the Valley) is a 1938 Norwegian drama film written and directed by Olav Dalgard, starring Tryggve Larssen and Ragnhild Hald. It follows the trials and tribulations of contemporary lumberjacks.

Cast
 Tryggve Larssen as Knut Slettås, a forest worker
 Ragnhild Hald as Laura, his wife
 Ida Rothmann as Tordis, their daughter
 Kåre Wicklund as Per, their son
 Astrid Sommer as the grandmother
 Harald Steen as the doctor
 Martin Linge as a policeman
 Finn Bernhoft as a forest worker
 Kolbjørn Brenda as a forest worker
 Rolf Nannestad as a forest worker
 Hans Bille as a forest owner
 Pehr Qværnstrøm as a forest owner
 Martin Gisti as a strikebreaker

External links
 
 Det drønner gjennom dalen at the Norwegian Federation of Film Societies (NFK)
 Det drønner gjennom dalen at the National Library of Norway

1938 films
1938 drama films
Norwegian black-and-white films
Norwegian drama films
Films directed by Olav Dalgard
1930s Norwegian-language films